In the mathematical area of graph theory, a -leaf power of a tree  is a graph  whose vertices are the leaves of  and whose edges connect pairs of leaves whose distance in  is at most .

These graphs have applications in phylogeny, the problem of reconstructing evolutionary trees.

Related classes of graphs
Since powers of strongly chordal graphs are strongly chordal and trees are strongly chordal, it follows that leaf powers are strongly chordal graphs. 
Actually, leaf powers form a proper subclass of strongly chordal graphs; a graph is a leaf power if and only if it is a fixed tolerance NeST graph and such graphs are a proper subclass of strongly chordal graphs.

In  it is shown that interval graphs and  the larger class of rooted directed path graphs are leaf powers. The indifference graphs are exactly the leaf powers whose underlying trees are caterpillar trees.

The -leaf powers for bounded values of  have bounded clique-width, but this is not true of leaf powers with unbounded exponents.

Structure and recognition

A graph is a 3-leaf power if and only if it is a (bull, dart, gem)-free chordal graph.
Based on this characterization and similar ones, 3-leaf powers can be recognized in linear time.

linear time recognition. Recognition of the 5-leaf and 6-leaf power graphs are also solved in linear time by Chang and Ko (2007) and Ducoffe (2018), respectively.

For  the recognition problem of -leaf powers was unsolved for a long time, but  showed that -leaf powers can be recognized in polynomial time for any fixed . However, the high dependency on the parameter  makes this algorithm unsuitable for practical use.

Notes

References

.
.
.
.
.
.
.
.
.
.
.
.
.
.
.
.
.
.
.
.

Graph families
Perfect graphs